Barbro Arfwidsson (born 20 September 1932) is a Swedish female curler.

In 1978 she was inducted into the Swedish Curling Hall of Fame.

Personal life
She was married to Swedish curler Rolf Arfwidsson, a  participant and 1962 Swedish men's champion curler. Her younger sister Inga was her teammate and skip.

Teams

References

External links
 
Svensk Curling nr 1 2013 by Svenska Curlingförbundet - issuu (page 12-13, "Inga Arfwidsson")

Living people
1932 births
Swedish female curlers
European curling champions
Swedish curling champions
20th-century Swedish women